Thyce is a genus of May beetles and junebugs in the family Scarabaeidae. There are at least two described species in Thyce.

Species
These two species belong to the genus Thyce:
 Thyce deserta Hardy, 1974
 Thyce squamicollis LeConte, 1856

References

Further reading

 
 
 
 
 

Melolonthinae
Articles created by Qbugbot